The 32nd  Senate District of Wisconsin is one of 33 districts in the Wisconsin State Senate.  Located in western Wisconsin, the district comprises all of Crawford County, as well as nearly all of La Crosse and Vernon counties, and most of the southern half of Monroe County.  It includes the cities of La Crosse, Onalaska, Prairie du Chien, and Viroqua.

Current elected officials
Brad Pfaff is the current senator representing the 32nd district. He was elected in the 2020 general election.  Before his election as senator, he served nearly two years as Acting Secretary of the Wisconsin Department of Agriculture, Trade and Consumer Protection.

Each Wisconsin State Senate district is composed of three Wisconsin State Assembly districts.  The 32nd Senate district comprises the 94th, 95th, and 96th Assembly districts.  The current representatives of those districts are:
 Assembly District 94: Steve Doyle (D–Onalaska)
 Assembly District 95: Jill Billings (D–La Crosse)
 Assembly District 96: Loren Oldenburg (R–Viroqua)

The district is located entirely within Wisconsin's 3rd congressional district, which is represented by U.S. Representative Ron Kind.

History
The 32nd District was created in 1861 after the 1860 United States census, when the State Senate was expanded from 30 to 33 members. The first to represent the district was M. D. Bartlett, a Republican from Durand who served in the 1862 and 1863 sessions. At that time, the district consisted of Buffalo, Chippewa, Clark, Dunn, Eau Claire, Jackson, Pepin and Trempeleau Counties.

Past senators
The district has been represented by:

Note: The boundaries of districts have changed over history. Previous politicians of a specific numbered district will have represented a different geographic area, due to redistricting.

References

External links
District Website
Senator Schilling's Website

Wisconsin State Senate districts
Crawford County, Wisconsin
Richland County, Wisconsin
Vernon County, Wisconsin
Monroe County, Wisconsin
La Crosse County, Wisconsin
1861 establishments in Wisconsin